Raúl López may refer to:

Raúl López del Castillo (1893-1963), Cuban lawyer
Raúl López (baseball) (born 1929), Cuban baseball player
Raúl López (wrestler) (fl. 1932), Mexican wrestler
Raül López (basketball) (born 1980), Spanish basketball player
Raúl López (footballer, born 1976), Spanish football left-back
Raúl López (footballer, born 1993), Mexican football winger